Kontakion for You Departed is a book by Alan Paton dedicated to his wife Dorrie Francis Lusted. The book was published in 1969, two years after her death from emphysema in 1967.

External links
Book Details on Amazon

1969 novels
Jonathan Cape books
20th-century South African literature